Seben is a town in Bolu Province in the Black Sea region of Turkey, 56 km south of the town of Bolu. It is the seat of Seben District. Its population is 2,395 (2021). The mayor is Fatih Kavak (AKP).

Places of interest
 The high meadows (yayla), average 1400 m, on the flanks of Kiraz Dağı mountain. Of these Kızık yayla with its attractive wooden houses is the best-known. 
 Bağlum Kaplıcaları healing thermal water spring in the village of Kesenözü, 14 km south of Seben.

References

Populated places in Bolu Province
Seben District
Towns in Turkey